Victor Lo Chung-wing, GBM, OBE, JP (born November 1950, Hong Kong) is the chairman and chief executive of Gold Peak Technology Group Ltd.

He was Chairman of the Council of the Hong Kong Polytechnic University from 2004 to 2009. He was also a non-official member of Executive Council of Hong Kong from 2007 to 2009.

Lo is of Foshan ancestry.

External links
The Honourable Victor LO Chung-wing, GBS, JP

References

1950 births
Living people
Hong Kong chief executives
People from Huiyang
Hong Kong people of Hakka descent
Officers of the Order of the British Empire
Members of the Executive Council of Hong Kong
Hong Kong Polytechnic University people
Recipients of the Gold Bauhinia Star
Recipients of the Grand Bauhinia Medal
Date of birth missing (living people)
Members of the Election Committee of Hong Kong, 2007–2012
Members of the Election Committee of Hong Kong, 2017–2021